David Ashby (11 November 1949 – 16 September 2015) was a British motorcycle speedway rider, brother of Martin Ashby.

Career
Born in Marlborough, England, he rode for Swindon Robins between 1972 and 1978, making 151 appearances, and had spells riding for Peterborough Panthers and Milton Keynes Knights.
His two sons, Lee and Jamie, rode motocross with their dad, David, acting as mechanic.

Background
He retired in 1979. He died of cancer on 16 September 2015, aged 65.

References

External links
http://www.swindonrobins.co/1970s.php 

1949 births
2015 deaths
British motorcycle racers
British speedway riders
Swindon Robins riders
Peterborough Panthers riders
Milton Keynes Knights riders